The Macon metropolitan area is a metropolitan area consisting of five counties in Central Georgia (Bibb, Crawford, Jones, Monroe, and Twiggs) anchored by the principal city of Macon. The Office of Management and Budget defines the area as one of its metropolitan statistical areas (the Macon, GA MSA), a designation used for statistical purposes by the United States Census Bureau and other agencies.

As of the 2010 census, the five-county area had a population of 232,293. A July 2017 estimate placed the population at 228,914.

Communities

Places with more than 100,000 inhabitants
Macon (Consolidated City-County) (Principal city) Pop:155,369

Places with 1,000 to 10,000 inhabitants
Forsyth
Gray
Jeffersonville
Roberta

Places with less than 1,000 inhabitants
Allentown (portion within Twiggs County)
Danville (portion within Twiggs County)
Culloden

Census-designated place
Bolingbroke
Juliette
Knoxville 
Musella 
Smarr

Unincorporated places
Avondale
Franklinton
Haddock
Lizella
Payne (formerly incorporated) 
Rutland
Sofkee
Walden

Demographics
As of the census of 2000, there were 222,368 people, 84,338 households, and 58,788 families residing within the MSA. The racial makeup of the MSA was 56.26% White, 41.37% African American, 0.21% Native American, 0.85% Asian, 0.02% Pacific Islander, 0.48% from other races, and 0.80% from two or more races. Hispanic or Latino of any race were 1.30% of the population.

The median income for a household in the MSA was $38,297, and the median income for a family was $44,810. Males had a median income of $33,480 versus $23,523 for females. The per capita income for the MSA was $17,558.

Combined Statistical Area

The Macon–Warner Robins–Fort Valley Combined Statistical Area (CSA) includes seven counties in Georgia within the Macon and Warner Robins metropolitan statistical areas. As of the 2010 Census, the CSA had a population of 411,898. As of July 1, 2017, the population is now estimated to be 420,693.

Component Metropolitan Statistical Areas (MSAs)
Macon MSA (Bibb, Crawford, Jones, Monroe, and Twiggs counties)
Warner Robins MSA (Houston and Peach counties)

See also
Central Georgia
Georgia census statistical areas

References

 
Geography of Bibb County, Georgia
Geography of Jones County, Georgia
Geography of Monroe County, Georgia
Geography of Crawford County, Georgia
Geography of Twiggs County, Georgia
Metropolitan areas of Georgia (U.S. state)
Regions of Georgia (U.S. state)